The 2027 AFC Asian Cup will be the 19th edition of the AFC Asian Cup, the quadrennial international men's football championship of Asia organised by the Asian Football Confederation (AFC). The tournament involves 24 national teams after the expansion in 2019. It will be held in Saudi Arabia.

Host selection

AFC confirmed that the following member associations expressed their interests to host 2027 Asian Cup before the 30 June 2020 deadline, and they gave their necessary letters of undertaking in November. On 17 October 2022, the AFC Executive Committee announced that the host of the 2027 AFC Asian Cup would be chosen by the AFC Congress at its next meeting on 1 February 2023 in Manama, Bahrain. However, India, one of the last two bidders, withdrew on 5 December leaving Saudi Arabia as the only remaining bidder. On 1 February, the AFC confirmed that Saudi Arabia won the bid and will host the tournament for the first time.

Qualification

The first two rounds of qualification will act as part of the Asian qualification for the 2026 FIFA World Cup. Saudi Arabia, which received automatic qualification for the Asian Cup as host, is also expected to participate in the qualifiers to qualify for the 2026 World Cup.

Northern Mariana Islands, whose football association became the 47th full AFC member during the confederation's 30th Congress on 9 December 2020, are eligible to enter the qualification tournament only for the Asian Cup.

Qualified teams

Venues
The following are the host cities and venues selected for Saudi Arabia's bid:

References

External links
AFC Asian Cup, the-AFC.com

 
2027
2027 in Asian football
2020s in Saudi Arabian sport
2027
Scheduled association football competitions